David Marcel Levine (born 1970) is a theater professor and visual artist, currently a Professor of the Practice of Performance, Theater, and Media at Harvard University.

Early life and education
Levine was born in 1970 in New York City to Morton and Anne Marie Levine. He holds a B.A. from Cornell University (1992) and an M.A. in English Literature from Harvard University (1996).

Selected works
Levine's work encompasses performance, installation, and video. Performance installations include Bauerntheater, Farmers’ Theater in 2007, a project in Joachimsthal, Germany sponsored by the German Federal Cultural Foundation in which he hired an American actor to learn German farming and then "farm" on a publicly accessible field for 10 hours a day, six days a week, for six weeks. This was an early example of his later themes of "acting as a technique for absolutely turning into someone else."

In 2012 he created the performance installation Habit in which the audience is mobile, viewing the performance through the windows of a house, moving from vantage point to vantage point as the action moves. The actors in Habit worked for eight-hour days, performing the same 90 minutes worth of dialogue by playwright Jason Grote, but improvising the staging from moment-to-moment.  In the summer of 2015, as a commission from the public art organization Creative Time, he restaged iconic scenes from movies set in New York's Central Park. Actors performed the scenes in their original location, on a perpetual loop, for six hours a day.  in what The New Yorker called "A Real-Life GIF in Central Park".

Levine's solo exhibition Some of the People, All of The Time featured 8 actors performing a monologue from the point of view of a movie crowd extra turned paid protester. The New York Times called it some of the best art of 2018.

Levine worked as a theater director in New York and Berlin before branching out into conceptual art. For his first solo gallery show, he created an installation entitled Hopeful at the Feinkost gallery in Berlin, which consisted of thousands of actors' headshots collected from the trash cans of New York casting agencies, a meta-commentary on the headshot-as-object.

Writing
Levine's essays on art, theater, and performance, have been published widely. He is the author, along with Alix Rule, of the 2012 essay, International Art English which describes and diagrams the language of contemporary art by analyzing artists’ statements, wall labels, criticism, and a corpus of more than fourteen thousand press releases sent by e-flux. The essay has been both anthologized and republished, and considered a key text (and term) in debates over the politics of art writing. He wrote and contributed images to A Discourse on Method , an artists' book he created with Shonni Enelow which came out in 2019. An anthology of his writing, Best Behavior, will be published in 2020.

Levine's father was one of the executors of the estate of Mark Rothko, a situation that turned into a protracted legal dispute, the Rothko Case. He wrote about the effect that had on his family and his career for Triple Canopy in Matter of Rothko.

Awards and recognition
Levine was a 2013 Fellow in Visual Arts at the Radcliffe Institute for Advanced Study. He was the recipient of a 2018 Guggenheim Fellowship. His installation Habit received a 2013 Village Voice Obie award.

His work has been presented by MoMA, Mass MoCA, PS1, and the Museum of Fine Arts, Boston. He has received fellowships and grants from the New York Foundation for the Arts, the MacDowell Colony, the Watermill Center and the Foundation for Contemporary Arts.

References

External links
 Personal website
 Video excerpts from Some of the People All of the Time
 Text of Some of the People All of the Time

1970 births
Living people
Harvard University alumni
Cornell University alumni
American conceptual artists
Obie Award recipients
American male artists